Claude Papi (16 April 1949 – 28 January 1983) was a French football midfielder who is regarded as the all-time best player for the SC Bastia.

Playing career
Born in Porto-Vecchio, Corsica, Papi played his entire career for SC Bastia. He led Bastia to the 1978 UEFA Cup Final, scoring seven goals that season. Papi remains the all-time leading scorer for Bastia with 134 goals in 479 games.

International career
Papi was a member of the France national team in the 1978 FIFA World Cup. His only World Cup appearance came in a 3–1 group match win against Hungary.

Death
Papi died on 28 January 1983 at the age of 33 of a ruptured aneurysm.

Honours
Bastia
 Ligue 2: 1967–68
 Coupe de France: 1980–81
 Challenge des champions: 1972
 UEFA Cup runner-up: 1978

See also
 List of one-club men in association football

References

 Papi's Career Stats & Accolades

External links
 
 
 

1949 births
1983 deaths
People from Porto-Vecchio
French footballers
Association football midfielders
France international footballers
SC Bastia players
Ligue 1 players
Ligue 2 players
1978 FIFA World Cup players
Footballers from Corsica